Riley Bonner (born 7 March 1997) playing for the Port Adelaide Football Club in the Australian Football League (AFL). He was drafted by Port Adelaide with their first selection and thirty-seventh overall in the 2015 national draft. He made his debut in the twenty-three point win against  in round 23, 2016 at Metricon Stadium.

In 2018, Bonner received a nomination for the 2018 AFL Rising Star award after recording 31 disposals in the win against  in round 1.

References

External links

1997 births
Living people
Port Adelaide Football Club players
Port Adelaide Football Club players (all competitions)
West Adelaide Football Club players
Australian rules footballers from South Australia